Pascal Camadini (born 2 April 1972) is a French former professional footballer who played as a midfielder. He started playing in the youth teams of SC Bastia, ending his career at Racing Strasbourg in 2008. Whilst at Strasbourg, Camadini played in the 2001 Coupe de France Final in which they beat Amiens SC on penalties.

References

External links
 
Profile at RC Strasbourg's official site

1972 births
Living people
Sportspeople from Bastia
French footballers
Footballers from Corsica
Association football midfielders
Ligue 1 players
Ligue 2 players
Swiss Super League players
SC Bastia players
FC Sion players
FC Lorient players
RC Strasbourg Alsace players
French expatriate footballers
French expatriate sportspeople in Switzerland
Expatriate footballers in Switzerland